Junius / Rosetta is a split EP by American art rock band Junius and American post metal band Rosetta. After several years of planning, the title was made available on September 27, 2011 through Translation Loss in CD format and on November 22, 2011 through The Mylene Sheath in vinyl format. However, the vinyl release was limited, and only 1,000 copies have been pressed for distribution. Junius / Rosetta includes two original tracks by both bands and a download card to obtain additional content online, including two cover songs originally by Soundgarden and Hum.

Kickstarter
Funding for studio time and mixing of the tracks "TMA-3" and "4th of July" was made possible by fan donations through Kickstarter. Rosetta was highly successful in raising $2,611 through this project after a series of setbacks threatened to delay the split release further.

Track listing

Personnel
Junius
Joseph E. Martinez - vocals, lyrics, guitar, synths
Michael Repasch-Nieves - guitar
Joel Munguia - bass
Dana Filloon - drums

Rosetta
Michael Armine – sound manipulation, vocals
David Grossman – bass guitar, vocals
Bruce McMurtrie Jr. – drums
J. Matthew Weed – electric guitar, violin

Production
Andrew Schneider - Recording (TMA-3 and 4 July) at Translator Audio studio in Brooklyn, New York

References

2011 EPs
Split EPs
Junius (band) albums
Rosetta (band) albums
Post-metal albums